Chrysolina suffriani is a species of beetle from the Chrysomelidae family, inhabits in Sardinia, Corsica.

Description
The species are of brown colour.

References

Beetles described in 1889
Chrysomelinae
Taxa named by Léon Fairmaire